The election of MEPs representing Germany constituency for the 2004–2009 term of the European Parliament was held on 13 June 2004.

The elections saw a heavy defeat for the ruling Social Democratic Party, which polled its lowest share of the vote since World War II. More than half of this loss, however, went to other parties of the left, particularly the Greens. The votes of the opposition conservative parties, the Christian Democratic Union and the Christian Social Union, also fell, though not as sharply as the SPD's. The liberal Free Democratic Party improved its vote and gained representation.

Results

References

External links
Europawahl 2004 - Der Bundeswahlleiter

Germany
European Parliament elections in Germany
European Parl

de:Europawahl 2004#Deutschland